Strela is a rugby union club based in Kazan, Russia.

Honours

Rugby League

 Russian Championships (6): 1995, 1996, 1997, 1998, 1999, 2001
 Runner-up (8): 2000, 2002, 2003, 2004, 2005, 2006, 2007, 2008
 Russian Cup (7): 1993, 1995, 1996, 1997, 1998, 1999, 2000

Rugby Union

Strela won the Russian Top League in 2011. Than participate in the Professional Rugby League in 2012 (6 place) and 2013 (4 place) seasons.

Club staff

Head coach – JP Nel 

Forwards coach – Jaco Engels 

Strength and conditioning coach – Timur Khafizov 

Coach Analyst – Marat Ziatdinov

Current squad
2022

International honours

References 

The information in this article is based on that in its Russian equivalent.

Russian rugby union teams
Professional Rugby League teams